Michael Girsch is an American baseball executive. He is the general manager for the St. Louis Cardinals of Major League Baseball.

Career
Girsch graduated from the University of Notre Dame with a bachelor of science in mathematics in 1998 and the University of Chicago Booth School of Business with a Master of Business Administration in 2003. He worked in valuations for Boston Consulting Group in Chicago.

In 2005, wanting to pursue a career in Major League Baseball (MLB), Girsch wrote an academic paper on the valuation of MLB draft picks and sent it to teams. John Mozeliak, the general manager of the St. Louis Cardinals, responded and hired him in 2006 as the coordinator for amateur scouting. He was promoted to director of baseball development in 2008 and to assistant general manager in 2011.

In 2017, the Cardinals promoted Mozeliak to the new position of President of Baseball Operations and promoted Girsch to general manager. As general manager, he signed Paul DeJong, Paul Goldschmidt, and Matt Carpenter to contract extensions. The Cardinals signed Girsch to a multi-year contract extension in 2022.

Personal life
Girsch is from Hinsdale, Illinois, and graduated from Benet Academy. He and his wife, Kelly, live in Webster Groves, Missouri, and have four children.

References

Living people
People from Illinois
Notre Dame College of Arts and Letters alumni
Major League Baseball general managers
St. Louis Cardinals executives
University of Chicago Booth School of Business alumni
Year of birth missing (living people)